The Aviamilano P.19 Scricciolo (Italian: "Wren") was a light civil trainer aircraft built in Italy in the 1960s.

Design and development
The Scicciolo was designed at the Centro Volo a Vela del Politecnico di Milano to compete in a competition arranged by the Aero Club d'Italia for a light civil trainer. The aircraft was evaluated by the Milan Aero Club. The CVV P.19 emerged victorious and two batches of twenty-five were produced at the Aviomilano factory.

The Scricciolo was a low-wing monoplane with tailwheel undercarriage (although some were fitted with tricycle gear and designated P.19Tr). The pilot and instructor sat side by side under a large bubble canopy. The fuselage was of fabric-covered steel tube construction while the wings and tail surfaces were made of wood with plywood covering.

After 1964, a few examples were fitted with 112 kW (150 hp) Lycoming O-320 engines for use as glider tugs and designated P.19R

Variants
CVV P.19 Scricciolo
The prototype designed and built at the Centro Volo a Vela del Politecnico di Milano for the Aero Club d'Italia competition for a new light civil trainer.
P.19 ScriccioloThe main production version of the Scricciolo
P.19Tr ScriccioloProduction aircraft fitted with tricycle undercarriage.
P.19R (R - Rimorchio - tug) Rebuild with  Lycoming O-320 for use as a glider tug.

Specifications (P.19)

References

See also

1950s Italian civil trainer aircraft